Salim–Sulaiman is an Indian score composer duo consisting of siblings Salim Merchant and Sulaiman Merchant. The duo compose music predominantly for Hindi films.

Life and early career
Salim–Sulaiman's ancestral town is Mundra, Kutch, Gujarat. They were born in Mumbai. Salim Merchant was born on 3 March 1974 and Sulaiman Merchant was born on 21 December 1970. They were inspired by their father Sadruddin Merchant, who used to lead Ismaili Scouts Orchestra in India. Steeped in a family tradition of music as the sons of composer and veteran of the film industry Sadruddin Merchant, Salim mastered the piano on at the Trinity College of Music in London while Sulaiman took up tabla training with such legends as Taufiq Qureshi and Ustad Zakir Hussain. Six years after their first music composition for a Bollywood film, they received acclaim for the film score of Bhoot.

Salim and Sulaiman have been composing music for over a decade having scored for movies such as Neal 'n' Nikki, Chak De! India, Rab Ne Bana Di Jodi and Fashion. The duo had also composed for many Indi-pop performers including Viva, Aasmaan, Shweta Shetty, Jasmine and Style Bhai among others, composed and produced several TV commercials and collaborated with artistes such as K.S.Chithra, Ustad Zakir Hussain and Ustad Sultan Khan. After that, they have gone to do movies with well-known producers and directors like Yash Chopra, Subhash Ghai and Ram Gopal Varma. They were predominantly composing background scores for movies, until the Karan Johar-Shah Rukh Khan production Kaal, for which their song compositions received acclaim.

Salim Merchant was one of the three judges for the fifth season of Indian Idol on Sony Entertainment Television (India).

They have worked on a Bollywood remix for Lady Gaga's songs Born This Way and Judas. They also worked on I'm A Freak By Enrique. The duo did two songs for the Hollywood film Sold. During the 2020 lockdown Salim–Sulaiman released Gandhi Jayanti single with Ricky Kej. The duo have produced various tracks in collaboration with a number of indie artists including Shivansh Jindal.

2010 FIFA World Cup
The musical duo collaborated with South African singer Loyiso Bala and Kenyan singer and songwriter Eric Wainaina to record the anthem for 2010 FIFA World Cup. The anthem is the song "Africa – You're A Star".

Indian Idol
Salim Merchant was a judge along with Anu Malik and Sunidhi Chauhan in season 5 and season 6 of Indian Idol. Salim has judged the second season of Indian Idol Junior along with Vishal Dadlani and Sonakshi Sinha.

He was one among the four judges with Coach Shaan, Coach Benny, and Coach Neeti in the second season of The Voice India.

Awards

Filmography as composers

For songs

The Power (2021)
Coolie No. 1 (2020)
Prawaas (2020)
Setters (2019)
102 Not Out (2018)
Poorna: Courage Has No Limit (2017)
Janaan (2016)
Jai Gangaajal (2016)
Wedding Pullav (2015)
22 Yards (2014)
Ungli (2014)
 Mardaani (2014)
 Kaanchi: The Unbreakable (2014)
 Rabba Main Kya Karoon (2013)
 Satyagraha (2013)
 Chakravyuh (2012)
 Heroine (2012)
 Jodi Breakers (2012) 
 Ladies vs Ricky Bahl (2011)
 Shakal Pe Mat Ja (2011)
 Aazaan (2011)
 Love Breakups Zindagi (2011)
 Anaganaga O Dheerudu (Telugu) (2011)
 Band Baaja Baaraat (2010)
 Aashayein (2010)
 Teen Patti (2010)
 Pyaar Impossible! (2010)
 Rocket Singh: Salesman of the Year (2009)
 Kurbaan (2009)
 Luck (2009)
 Wonder Pets! (2009)
 8 x 10 Tasveer (2009)
 Rab Ne Bana Di Jodi (2008)
 Fashion (2008)
 Roadside Romeo (2008)
 Bombay to Bangkok (2008)
 Samar (2008)
 Aaja Nachle (2007)
 Chak De! India (2007)
 Chain Kulii Ki Main Kulii (2007)
 Dor (2006)
 Neal 'n' Nikki (2005)
 Iqbal (2006)
 Kaal (2005)
 Darna Mana Hai (2003)
 Bhoot (2003)
 Gate To Heaven (2003)
 3 Deewarein (2003)
 Ghaath (2000)

For background score 

Skater Girl (2021)
Coolie No. 1 (2020)
 Desert Dolphin (2020)
 Student of the Year 2 (2019)
 Race 3 (2018)
 Kaabil (2017)
 Bang Bang! (2014)
 Gori Tere Pyaar Mein (2013) 
 Dhoom 3 (2013)
 Krrish 3 (2013)
 Race 2 (2013)
 Cocktail (2012)
 Anaganaga O Dheerudu (2011) (Telugu)
 Anjaana Anjaani (2010)
 I Hate Luv Storys (2010)
 Kites (2010)
 Paathshaala (2010)
 Wanted (2009)
 Love Aaj Kal (2009)
 De Dana Dan (2009)
 Dostana (2008)
 Bachna Ae Haseeno (2008)
 Fashion (2008)
 Bhoothnath (2008)
 God Tussi Great Ho (2008)
 Singh Is Kinng (2008)
 Race (2008)
 Ta Ra Rum Pum (2007)
 Sunday (2007)
 Partner (2007)
 Dhoom 2 (2006)
 Krrish (2006)
 36 China Town (2006)
 Shortcut (2006)
 Ustad & Divas (2006)
 Fanaa (2006)
 Pyare Mohan (2006)
 Being Cyrus (2006)
 Fight Club – Members Only (2006)
 Mere Jeevan Saathi (2006)
 Dosti: Friends Forever (2005)
 Vaah! Life Ho Toh Aisi! (2005)
 Salaam Namaste (2005)
 No Entry (2005)
 Barsaat (2005)
 Maine Pyaar Kyun Kiya? (2005)
 Naina (2005)
 Matrubhoomi: A Nation Without Women (2005)
 Vaada (2005)
 Koffee with Karan (TV Series) (2004)
 Aitraaz (2004)
 Dhoom (2004)
 Shock (2004) (Tamil)
 Mujhse Shaadi Karogi (2004)
 Hyderabad Blues 2 (2004)
 Hum Tum (2004)
 Ab Tak Chhappan (2004)
 Agni Pankh (2004)
 Kahan Ho Tum (2003)
 Qayamat (2003)
 Moksha (2001)
 Pyaar Mein Kabhi Kabhi (1999)
 Hameshaa (1997)

Salim Merchant as a Singer

Discography as composers

References

External links
 Salim and Sulaiman Official Website

Indian male playback singers
Indian Ismailis
Indian Sufis
Singers from Mumbai
Indian musical duos
Filmfare Awards winners
Hindi film score composers
Performers of Sufi music
People from Kutch district
People from Bhuj
Gujarati people
Indian pop composers
Bollywood playback singers
21st-century Indian singers
Kutchi people
Indian male film score composers
21st-century Indian male singers
Khoja Ismailism